The Doubtless River is a river of northern Canterbury, New Zealand.

The New Zealand Department of Conservation maintains a backcountry hut near the junction of the Doubtless and Doubtful Rivers.

See also
List of rivers of New Zealand

References
Footnotes

Bibliography
Land Information New Zealand - Search for Place Names

Hurunui District
Rivers of Canterbury, New Zealand
Rivers of New Zealand